The 1999 Spengler Cup was held in Davos, Switzerland from December 26 to December 31, 1999.  All matches were played at HC Davos's home arena, Eisstadion Davos. The final was won 6-2 by Kölner Haie over Metallurg Magnitogorsk.

Teams participating
 Kölner Haie
 Metallurg Magnitogorsk
 Team Canada
 HC Davos
 Färjestads BK

Tournament

Round-Robin results

All times local (CET/UTC +1)

Finals

External links
Spenglercup.ch

1999-2000
1999–2000 in Swiss ice hockey
1999–2000 in Swedish ice hockey
1999–2000 in Canadian ice hockey
1999–2000 in Russian ice hockey
1999–2000 in German ice hockey
December 1999 sports events in Europe